McCarthy Stone is a developer and manager of retirement communities in the United Kingdom. It was acquired by Lone Star Funds in 2021.

History
John McCarthy and Bill Stone became partners in 1961, and in 1977 they built their first retirement housing development in Hampshire. Subsequently they ceased other building work to concentrate on developing specialist housing for elderly people. By 1982, when the company was floated on the Unlisted Securities Market, the company had completed 15 retirement housing developments and was selling around 200 units a year. Growth was rapid after the flotation, and by 1984 the company operated on a national basis with annual sales approaching 1,000 units. The business was exceptionally profitable due to a rapidly ageing population. Annual sales reached 2,601 units in 1988.
	
The company was de-listed from the London Stock Exchange in 2006 following a successful takeover bid of over £1 billion from a consortium including David and Simon Reuben and Sir Tom Hunter. The company was refinanced in 2013 under new ownership, and re-listed on the London Stock Exchange in 2015.

In 2020, the directors accepted a takeover bid from American private equity investment firm Lone Star Funds. Shareholders approved the takeover offer worth £647m.

In 2021, the company announced a new investment partnership with Macquarie and John Laing to finance its new rental portfolio.

The company is the only UK developer, of any size or type, to win the full five-star rating in the Home Builders Federation's customer satisfaction awards every year the survey has been run.

Services 

The company's in-house Services teams operate its Retirement Living and Retirement Living PLUS (Extra Care) schemes built since 2010. In its Retirement Living PLUS schemes, services include the provision of CQC-regulated care and support. It is also the largest provider of new Extra Care developments in the UK.

It remains as the landlord and managing agent on all developments opened since 2010, and hence is legally responsible for the operation of these schemes.

As of 2018, the company provides a choice of tenure including rental and affordable and private shared ownership, an expanded care offering and more products.

Awards

Charity initiatives 
In 2017, the company raised over £250,000 for the Royal Voluntary Service. The company's charity partner for 2019 was Beanstalk, a national learning and literacy charity for young children. The company has also supported several smaller charities.

In 2020, it established the McCarthy Stone Charitable Foundation, which raised £230,000 in its first year.

References

External links

Housebuilding companies of the United Kingdom
Companies based in Bournemouth
Construction and civil engineering companies established in 1977
Housing for the elderly in the United Kingdom
Real estate companies established in 1977
1977 establishments in England
2021 mergers and acquisitions